The Early Bird Catches the Worm is a 2008 Italian drama film directed by Francesco Patierno, based on autobiographical book Il giocatore (ogni scomessa e un debito) by Marco Baldini.

Cast 

Elio Germano as Marco Baldini
Laura Chiatti as  Cristiana
Martina Stella as Cristina
Carlo Monni as Marco's father
Raffaella Lebboroni as Marco's Mother
Corrado Fortuna as  Rosario Fiorello
Donato Placido as  Giggetto
Dario Vergassola as  Claudio Cecchetto
Gianmarco Tognazzi as Danny
Umberto Orsini as Zio Lino
Chiara Francini as Loredana

References

External links

2008 films
Italian drama films
2008 drama films
2000s Italian films